Van Keurens is a hamlet in the town of Poughkeepsie, Dutchess County, New York, United States. It was established by Matheus Van Keuren in the eighteenth century.

The Van Keurens lived in Kingston, New York, but Matheus owned a foundry on a parcel of land on the Hudson River, close to what is now IBM, in the community of Spackenkill. Matheus forged at his foundry at Spackenkill many of the links of the chain used during the Revolutionary War as part of the Hudson River Chain around Fort Montgomery.

The hamlet is now partly a wooded, unpopulated area between IBM and the Clinton Point Quarry owned by Tilcon, Inc., and part of land that rests on a Spackenkill residential community known informally as Crown Heights.

External links
 About the Van Keurens
 Topographic map showing Van Keurens land from USGS The National Map

Hamlets in New York (state)
Hamlets in Dutchess County, New York